Albert Grønbæk Erlykke (born 23 May 2001) is a Danish footballer who plays for Norwegian side Bodø/Glimt.

Career
Grønbæk started his career in local club Vejlby-Risskov Idrætsklub before transferring to AGF in 2015 on a youth contract. Grønbæk made his debut for AGF in July 2020, when he came on in the 71st minute in a 3–2 win against AaB. Ahead of the 2020–21 Danish Superliga, Grønbæk was officially moved in to the AGF first team. In September 2020, he scored his first goal for the club in a 4–2 win against OB.

On 13 August 2022 it was confirmed, that Grønbæk had been sold to Norwegian Eliteserien club FK Bodø/Glimt, signing a deal until June 2027. AGF also stated that the sale of Grønbæk was a new record for the club.

Career statistics

References

External links
Albert Grønbæk at DBU

Living people
2001 births
Danish men's footballers
Danish expatriate men's footballers
Footballers from Aarhus
Association football midfielders
Denmark youth international footballers
Aarhus Gymnastikforening players
FK Bodø/Glimt players
Danish Superliga players
Danish expatriate sportspeople in Norway
Expatriate footballers in Norway